Datura reburra is a species of Datura. It is an annual shrub that is grown as an ornamental plant.

Contemporary experts classify this plant not as a separate species, but as a variety of Datura discolor.

References 

reburra